Vignana Bharathi Institute of Technology, Hyderabad is a UGC Auotonmous Engineering College affiliated to JNTUH,  Hyderabad offering engineering and MBA programmes is located in Hyderabad, India. Founded in 2004 by Dr. N. Goutham Rao, Dr  G. Manohar Reddy and Dr. K.K.V. Sharma. The college is situated at Ghatkesar. It has an annual intake of over 1400 students.

Academics
The college offers 6 B.Tech Programs: Computer Science and Engineering, Electronics and Communication Engineering, Electrical Electronics Engineering, Mechanical Engineering, Information Technology and Civil Engineering. The Post Graduate M.Tech programs include Communication System, Computer Science Engineering, Electrical Power Systems, Embedded Systems, CAD/CAM and Power Electronics and Drives. The college also offers a 2-year MBA Programme recognized by JNTU Hyderabad.

Departments
 Electronics and Communication Engineering
 Electrical and Electronics Engineering
 Civil Engineering
 Information Technology
 Humanities and Sciences
 Computer Science & Engineering
 Mechanical Engineering
 MBA

References

Analytical Symposium on Information Assurance was organised by VBIT in association with NASSCOM and DSCI.
VBIT student branch gets award
VBIT students successfully design windmill

External links
VBIT Hyderabad website

Universities and colleges in Hyderabad, India
Engineering colleges in Hyderabad, India
2004 establishments in Andhra Pradesh
Educational institutions established in 2004